Verkh-Usugli is a rural locality (a selo) and the administrative center of Tungokochensky District of Zabaykalsky Krai, Russia. Population:

Geography
The village is about 320 km northeast of the regional capital Chita. It is on the bank of the Usugli River.

History
The founding of the village is associated with the discovery in 1936 of the Usuglinsky fluorite deposit by S. K. Sobolev. In 1959-66,  the Usugli mine was constructed. The capital of Tungokochensky District was moved to Verkh-Usugli from Tungokochen in 1976.

References

Rural localities in Zabaykalsky Krai
1936 establishments in the Soviet Union